David Rintoul (born David Wilson; 29 November 1948) is a Scottish stage and television actor. Rintoul was born in Aberdeen, Scotland. He studied at the University of Edinburgh, and won a scholarship to study at the Royal Academy of Dramatic Art in London.

Theatre career
Rintoul has worked extensively in theatre with companies including the Royal National Theatre and Royal Shakespeare Company. His appearances have included Shakespeare's A Midsummer Night's Dream, Henry IV, As You Like It, and the title role in Macbeth. Other stage appearances include George Bernard Shaw's Candida and Funny Girl. In 2010 he played Charles Dickens in Andersen's English, the new play by Sebastian Barry.

Selected theatre roles
Epsom Downs, Joint Stock Theatre Company, 1977
The Speculator by David Greig – 1999 Traverse Theatre production at the Royal Lyceum Theatre, played John Law, and other roles
Remembrance of Things Past, Cottesloe and Olivier theatres, November 2000 – April 2001, as Charlus
Dirty Dancing (Aldwych Theatre, London) as Dr Jake Houseman
Gaslight (Royal Lyceum Theatre, Edinburgh)
Andersen's English by Sebastian Barry (Out of Joint and Hampstead Theatre), as Charles Dickens, 2010
Nell Gwynn (Shakespeare's Globe) as Arlington, 2015

Television and film career
Rintoul's film credits include the title role in Legend of the Werewolf (1975), A.D. (1985), Unrelated (2007) and Is Anybody There? (2008). In 2010, he starred in the film The Ghost Writer with Pierce Brosnan and Ewan McGregor. 

In 1980, he played the role of Mr Darcy in a BBC television adaptation by Fay Weldon of Pride and Prejudice. From 1993 to 1996 he played Doctor Finlay in the television series of the same name. His other television appearances include Prince Regent, Taggart, Hornblower and the Agatha Christie's Poirot film, The Mysterious Affair at Styles. He voices three characters, Granddad Dog, Mr. Bull and Dr. Brown Bear, in the popular children's series Peppa Pig. He also voiced the knight 'Sir Boris' in the 1999 animation The Big Knights and the arch villain Cut Throat Jake in the newer version of Captain Pugwash. He played the role of Noah in the 2013 History Channel's The Bible. In 2016 he portrayed Aerys Targaryen in the HBO series Game of Thrones in Season 6.

Selected television roles
1990 as Philip Ross (1 episode, "You'll Never Walk Alone", 1978)
Taggart (2 episodes, 1990 and 2005)
Hornblower as Dr. Clive, Ship's Surgeon (2001 and 2003)
Doctor Finlay as Dr. John Finlay (1993–1996)
Alleyn Mysteries as Sir John Phillips (1993)
Agatha Christie's Poirot -The Mysterious Affair at Styles as John Cavendish (1990)
Pride and Prejudice  as Fitzwilliam Darcy (1980 adaptation)
 Prince Regent (1979) as Dr John Willis
Lillie (1978) as Charles Longley
 Lord Peter Wimsey -Five Red Herrings as Jock Graham (1975)
Captain Pugwash (1998 version) as Cut Throat Jake / Governor of Portobello / Lieutenant Scratchwood / The Admiral
The Big Knights as Sir Boris
Peppa Pig as Granddad Dog / Mr. Bull / Dr. Brown Bear
Ben and Holly's Little Kingdom as Redbeard the Elf Pirate
Game of Thrones as Aerys II Targaryen
The Crown as Michael Adeane
Midsomer Murders “Blood on the Saddle” (2010) as Jack Fincher

Selected video games
El Shaddai: Ascension of the Metatron as Azazel
Final Fantasy XIV: Shadowbringers as Ran'jit
RuneScape as Zaros
Warhammer: Vermintide 2 as Bardin Goreksson

Audiobook narration
Rintoul has narrated many audiobooks, including Frederick Forsyth's The Day of the Jackal and J. G. Ballard's Millennium People. In 1986, he recorded unabridged readings of all of Ian Fleming's James Bond novels and short stories for Chivers Audio Books (with the exception of The Spy Who Loved Me, which has a first person female narrator). He also later recorded Nobody Lives Forever and Licence to Kill, written by John Gardner. Whilst reading the prose with his usual speaking voice, Rintoul speaks Bond's dialogue with a mild Scottish accent. 

He also narrated Robert Harris's Dictator, the final volume of his Cicero trilogy. Rintoul took over this role from Bill Wallis, who had read the previous two books, Imperium and Lustrum, but died two years before Dictator'''s publication. He has narrated two young people's books, The Boggart (2009) and The Boggart and the Monster (2013) written by Susan Cooper. Since 2015, he has been narrating the character of Sir James Powell in the audio drama series John Sinclair – Demon Hunter. In 2016 Rintoul narrated Philippe Sands' East West Street – the Origins of "Genocide" and "Crimes Against Humanity", and in 2018 he narrated Dorothy Dunnett's novel of Macbeth King Hereafter.

 Personal life 
Rintoul is married to actress Vivien Heilbron. A friend and University of Edinburgh classmate of Ian Charleson, Rintoul contributed a chapter to the 1990 book, For Ian Charleson: A Tribute. His brother, Dougie Wilson, is stage manager and £250,000 winner on Who Wants To Be A Millionaire?'' His sister Dorothy is married to the artist Alain Senez.

Notes

References
Theatre Record and its annual Indexes

External links

David Rintoul Bio at the London Shakespeare Workout

1948 births
Alumni of RADA
Alumni of the University of Edinburgh
Audiobook narrators
Living people
People from Aberdeen
Scottish male voice actors
Scottish male stage actors
Scottish male television actors
Scottish male Shakespearean actors
Scottish expatriates in Spain
Royal Shakespeare Company members
Male actors from Aberdeen
20th-century Scottish male actors
21st-century Scottish male actors